The Workingmen's Party of California (WPC) was an American labor organization, founded in 1877 and led by Denis Kearney, J. G. Day, and H. L. Knight.

Organizational history

As a result of heavy unemployment from the 1873–1878 national depression, Sand Lot rallies erupted in San Francisco that led to the Party's formation in 1877. The party won 11 seats in the State Senate and 17 in the State Assembly by 1878 and then rewrote the state's constitution, denying Chinese citizens voting rights in California. The most important part of the constitution included the formation of California Railroad Commission that would oversee the activities of the Central and Pacific Railroad companies that were run by Crocker, Huntington, Hopkins and Stanford.

The party took particular aim against cheap Chinese immigrant labor and the Central Pacific Railroad which employed them. Their goal was to "rid the country of Chinese cheap labor." Its famous slogan was "The Chinese must go!" Kearney's attacks against the Chinese were of a particularly virulent and openly racist nature, and found considerable support among white Californians of the time. This sentiment led eventually to the Chinese Exclusion Act of 1882.

By 1883, there were no WPC members left in either the state senate or state house of representatives.

Kearney's party should not be confused with the Workingmen's Party of the United States, which was mostly based in the Eastern United States. The branches of the Workingmen's Party of the United States that were in California were absorbed into the Workingmen's Party of California after the latter was growing at a rapid rate and had adopted similar language.

References

Further reading

Books and pamphlets
 George W. Greene, The Labor agitators, or, The Battle for Bread: The Party of the Future, the Workingmen's Party of California: Is Birth and Organization. Its Leaders and Its Purposes: Corruption in Our Local and State Governments. Venality of the Press. San Francisco: George W. Greene, n.d. [c. 1879].
 Denis Kearney, The Workingmen's Party of California: An Epitome of Its Rise and Progress. San Francisco: Bacon, 1878.
 — Speeches of Dennis Kearney, Labor Champion. New York: Jesse Haney & Co., 1878.
 Chinatown Declared a Nuisance! San Francisco, 1880.
 Neil Larry Shumsky, The Evolution of Political Protest and the Workingmen's Party of California. Columbus: Ohio State University Press, 1992.

Journal articles and dissertations
 Frank Michael Fahey, Denis Kearney: A Study in Demagoguery. Ph.D. dissertation. Stanford University, 1956.
 Roger William Hite, The Public Speaking of Denis Kearney, Labor Agitator. M.S. thesis. University of Oregon, 1967.
 Helen Havens Ingalls, The History of the Workingmen's Party of California. M.A. thesis. University of California, Berkeley, 1919.
 Charles Herzl Kahn, In-group and Out-group Responses to Radical Party Leadership: A Study of the Workingmen's Party of California. M.A. thesis. University of California, Berkeley, 1951.
 Carole Carter Mauss, The San Jose Branch of the Workingmen's Party of California, 1878-1880. M.A. thesis, San Jose State University, 1997.
 Doyce B. Nunis, Jr., "The Demagogue and the Demographer: Correspondence of Denis Kearney and Lord Bryce," Pacific Historical Review, vol. 36, no. 3 (August 1967), pp. 269–288.
 Mary Gabriel O'Connor, Denis Kearney, Sand-lot Orator: A Chronicle of California. M.A. thesis. Dominican College of San Rafael [CA], 1937.
 Robert Dean Potter, Denis Kearney: A Reappraisal. M.A. thesis. Chico State University, 1969.

Anti-Chinese sentiment in the United States
History of racism in California
White supremacist groups in the United States
Anti-immigration politics in the United States
White nationalist parties
Left-wing populism in the United States
1877 establishments in California